The 2007 Austrian Open (tennis) was a tennis tournament played on outdoor clay courts. It was the 37th edition of the Austrian Open, and was part of the International Series Gold of the 2007 ATP Tour. It took place at the Kitzbühel Sportpark Tennis Stadium in Kitzbühel, Austria, from 23 July through 30 July 2007.

Fifth-seeded Juan Mónaco won his third career title, all of which came in 2007.

Finals

Singles

 Juan Mónaco defeated  Potito Starace 5–7, 6–3, 6–4

Doubles

 Luis Horna /  Potito Starace defeated  Tomas Behrend /  Christopher Kas 7–6(7–4), 7–6(7–5)

References

External links
 ATP tournament profile
 ITF tournament edition details

 
Austrian Open (tennis)